Cikini Station is a railway station located on Jl. Cikini Raya, Cikini, Menteng, Jakarta.

History 
Cikini Station was originally a small railway stop which was built as a replacement for the Dierentuin railway stop. At that time, the Batavia City Council considered the location of the Dierentuin Stop to be bizarre and impractical for the development of the Gondangdia and Menteng areas. So that the Batavia City Council ordered the Staatsspoorwegen (SS) to build a new train stop as a replacement for the Dierentuin Stop. SS built 2 small bus stops located in Gondangdia and Menteng respectively. This railway stop was inaugurated in 1926 and was named Tjikini.

Until the late 1980s, to the south of this station, before Manggarai Station there used to be a train stop, namely Pegangsaan Stop which is located right on the north side of Jalan Diponegoro. The Pegangsaan railway stop was demolished in the late 1980s, when an elevated railroad was built between Manggarai and Jakarta Kota. From this railway stop, there was a branch line to Salemba Station.

Before the 1990s there was a railway track branching off to an opium factory located in Kramat and further on to the Rajawali–Jatinegara railway. After the factory closed in 1981, this side-track was dismantled.

Cikini Station, which is currently active, is an elevated railway station which is located in the southernmost part of the Jakarta Kota–Manggarai railway. On 5 June 1992, President Soeharto along with Mrs. Tien Soeharto and the ranks in the government inaugurated the elevated railway by taking the KRL from Gambir to Jakarta Kota Station.

Since 1 August 2019, this station, together with Sudirman, Palmerah, UI and Taman Kota Stations, has officially abolished the sale of single trip cards (Guaranteed Daily Tickets/THB) for KRL Commuter Lines. This is because the majority of KRL Commuter Line passengers are used to using multi-trip cards and electronic money. In this way, long queues to buy KRL tickets can be cut. However, service users can still tap-in/tap-out with THB cards at this station.

Building and layout 
The Cikini Station building is modern with a touch of brown panels which are still maintained to this day and have never been painted, only the platform pillars are now repainted to a beige color. It is known that the project, which began in February 1988, spent Rp. 432.5 billion and was not fully completed when it was inaugurated, so that it was fully operational a year later.

This station has only two railway lines. On the south side of this station there is a branch to the upper floor of the Manggarai Station, as part of the Manggarai Station renovation project.

Services
The following is a list of train services at the Cikini Station.

Passenger services 
 KAI Commuter

Supporting transportation

Incidents 

 On 31 August 2009 at 08:00 WIB, a man was stung by an electric cable while boarding the KRL 513 carriage from Bogor. As a result of this incident, the electricity between Manggarai–Gambir had to be turned off in order to evacuate the victim. This incident caused several KRL trips to be disrupted.

See also

 Rail transport in Indonesia

References

External links
 PT KAI  – the Indonesian rail company

central Jakarta
Railway stations in Jakarta